Lecithocera integrata is a moth in the family Lecithoceridae. It was described by Edward Meyrick in 1918. It is found in southern India.

The wingspan is about 16 mm. The forewings are rather dark fuscous, with the second discal stigma obscurely darker. The hindwings are pale grey.

References

Moths described in 1918
integrata